Bootsie may refer to:

 Bootsie Barnes, tenor saxophonist from Philadelphia, PA
 Bootsy Collins (born 1951), funk bassist, singer, and songwriter
 Bootsie and Snudge, a UK television series from the 1960s
Bootsie, the name of the character "Roadrunner" in the English subtitles of the film Kontroll
 Bootsie Neal
 Bootsie Books, the creation of author Mike James who currently lives in Perth, Western Australia
 Bootsie, the original name of Polly's cat in "The Cat Who..." series.  Bootsie was an unhappy cat until his name was changed to the more satisfactory "Brutus".
Caligula, third Emperor of Rome, who was given the name in his youth, which translates roughly to “Bootsie” or “Little Boots”.